Group 4 consisted of six of the 50 teams entered into the European zone: Austria, Belarus, Estonia, Latvia, Scotland and Sweden. These six teams competed on a home-and-away basis for two of the 15 spots in the final tournament allocated to the European zone, with the group's winner and runner-up claiming those spots.

Standings

Results

This game was a replay of the original game that took place in Tallinn on 9 October where the Estonian team failed to show up.

Notes

External links 
Group 4 Detailed Results at RSSSF

4
1996–97 in Austrian football
Qual
1996 in Belarusian football
1997 in Belarusian football
1996 in Estonian football
1997 in Estonian football
1996 in Latvian football
1997 in Latvian football
1996–97 in Scottish football
1996 in Swedish football
1997 in Swedish football
Qualification group